The Arab Youth Athletics Championships is an biennial international athletics competition between youth athletes (under-18) from Arabic countries. It is organised by the Arab Athletic Association.

If was first held in 2004, building upon the long-running senior Arab Athletics Championships (created 1977) and its corresponding Arab Junior Championships (begun in 1984). Initially being held in the same year as the junior championships, it was moved to an odd-year schedule (in-line with the senior event) to allow young athletes space between the two age category events.

Editions

Statistics

Wins by country

All-time medal table 2004 to 2019

Championships records
Key:

Men

Women

Notes

References

External links
Arab Athletics website

 
Athletics competitions in Asia
Athletics competitions in Africa
Athletics Youth
Recurring sporting events established in 2004
Under-18 athletics competitions
Biennial athletics competitions